Walkers is a Cayman Islands head-quartered offshore law firm. Walkers provides legal, corporate, compliance and fiduciary services to global corporations, financial institutions, capital markets participants and investment fund managers. Walkers practices the laws of six jurisdictions (Bermuda, British Virgin Islands, Cayman Islands, Guernsey, Jersey and Ireland) from ten offices globally. It is a member of the offshore magic circle.

History 
The firm was founded by Bill Walker (under the name W.S. Walker & Co.) shortly after Jamaican independence in 1962. Walkers is generally accepted as being the oldest Caymanian law firm, older than rivals Maples and Calder by about two years.

Merger talks 
In late 2007, discussions became public about a proposed merger between Walkers and Jersey-based Mourant du Feu & Jeune. Although mergers between offshore firms are relatively common, such a merger would be the first merger between two of the major global offshore players, creating by far the largest offshore law firm in the world. However, in February 2008 the two firms announced that they were no longer pursuing merger talks. Mourants subsequently merged with Guernsey firm Ozannes in 2010.

Sale of fiduciary business and establishment of new business 
In March 2012, Walkers announced it was selling its fiduciary business, Walkers Management Services, to the Intertrust Group. Like many offshore firms, Walkers' business was previously divided between its legal practice and fiduciary services.  Shortly afterwards, a large number of Walkers partners and senior associates defected to rival Caymanian law firm, Maples and Calder. Although none of the defecting partners confirmed any link between the events, the timing naturally creates an inference that there may have been a connection.

In May 2015, Walkers announced the establishment of a new fiduciary business called Walkers Professional Services (WPS).

Firm structure 
Walkers is headquartered in the Cayman Islands and has further offices in Dubai, Dublin, London, Singapore, Hong Kong and Bermuda. 

In July 2016, Walkers announced that they had acquired by merger the Guernsey law firm AO Hall. With the new Guernsey office, Walkers increased to having ten offices around the world.

Multi-jurisdictionalism 
Walkers was an early participant in the trend towards multi-jurisdictional offshore law firms, acquiring by merger British Virgin Islands law firm Barkers in 2001. It subsequently acquired Jersey law firm Crills in 2005.

Walkers Professional Services (WPS) 
Established as separate fiduciary business, WPS has a staff of over 120 providing corporate, corporate governance, regulatory and compliance and fiduciary services from Bermuda, the Cayman Islands, Dubai/ADGM, Hong Kong and Ireland to corporate and institutional clients across global financial centres.

Recognitions 

 In 2006, Walkers was named Offshore Law Firm of the Year by The Lawyer.

In 2008, Walkers was crowned Firm of the Year – Offshore Law Firm of the Year at the 2008 ALB Hong Kong Law Awards.
 In The Lawyer's 2015 Offshore Top 30 report of February 23, 2015, Joanne Harris pointed out that Walkers has now surpassed Maples and Calder as the largest offshore firm in Asia in terms of their number of lawyers.
 In 2017, Walkers was awarded the Who's Who Legal – Best Law Firm, Cayman Islands prize, the IFLR – Best Offshore Law Firm Asia prize and the Best Offshore Law Firm Award for Client Service at the HFM Week US Hedge Fund Services Awards.
 In 2018, Who's Who Legal awarded Walkers the Asset Recovery Firm of the Year award.
 In 2019, Global Restructuring Review named Walkers' Global Insolvency & Dispute Resolution Group the 12th strongest global law firm for restructuring and insolvency law making Walkers the highest ranked offshore law firm on the list.
 In the 2019 Chambers and Partners Global Guide, Walkers' practice groups received the highest number of rankings for an offshore law firm. Walkers is one of three international law firms ranked in the highest tier (Band 1) for offshore law with a total of 21 practice groups ranked for legal excellence.
 In 2020, Chambers and Partners honoured Walkers with the Asia-Pacific Offshore Firm of the Year award.
 The Chambers and Partners legal directory has rated Walkers as one of the top tier of multi-jurisdictional offshore law firms. In the 2020 Chambers and Partners Global Guide, Walkers maintained its stance as the go-to offshore law firm, leading the way with 10 "Band 1" practice area rankings and an overall Band 1 ranking in 'Global Offshore'. Walkers is ranked in the highest tier (Band 1) for "Offshore Law" with a total of 23 practice groups and 64 lawyers ranked for legal excellence.
 Walkers also retained its top tier ranking for 'Offshore' legal services in the 2020 Chambers and Partners Asia-Pacific guide and received a jurisdiction-leading nine lawyer rankings, four more rankings than the next Asia-based offshore law firm.

References

External links 
 
 Chambers and Partners Offshore Ranking

Offshore magic circle
Law firms of the Cayman Islands